William S. Dodge is an American legal scholar working as the John D. Ayer Chair in Business Law at the UC Davis School of Law.

Early life and education 
Dodge was born in Nigeria, where his parents were stationed while serving in the Peace Corps. Shortly after he was born, his family returned to the Marin Headlands in Northern California, where Dodge spent the remainder of his childhood. Dodge earned a Bachelor of Arts degree in history from Yale University in 1986 and a Juris Doctor from the Yale Law School in 1991.

Career 
After graduation from law school, he served as law clerk for William A. Norris of the Ninth Circuit Court of Appeals, and then Harry Blackmun of the Supreme Court. In 2011 and 2012, Dodge served as an international law counselor to the legal adviser of the Department of State, Harold Hongju Koh.

Dodge served as acting associate academic dean and professor at University of California, Hastings College of the Law. He is currently a faculty member at the UC Davis School of Law. Dodge's scholarship focuses on international law and business law. He has published at least 21 articles in major law reviews. His article "The Historical Origins of the Alien Tort Statute: A Response to the Originalists" in the Hastings Law Journal has been cited 168 times.

References

See also 
 List of law clerks of the Supreme Court of the United States (Seat 2)

Yale Law School alumni
Law
Law clerks of the Supreme Court of the United States
Living people
Year of birth missing (living people)

Yale University alumni
People from Marin County, California
California lawyers
UC Davis School of Law faculty
United States Department of State officials